Paulownia tomentosa, common names princess tree, empress tree, or foxglove-tree, is a deciduous hardwood tree in the family Paulowniaceae, native to central and western China. It is an extremely fast-growing tree with seeds that disperse readily, and is a persistent exotic invasive species in North America, where it has undergone naturalisation in large areas of the Eastern US. P. tomentosa has also been introduced to Western and Central Europe, and is establishing itself as a naturalised species there as well.

Etymology

The generic name Paulownia honours Anna Pavlovna of Russia, who was Queen Consort of the Netherlands from 1840 to 1849.  The specific epithet tomentosa is a Latin word meaning ‘covered in hairs’.

Description

On young growth, the leaves may be in whorls of three and be much bigger than the leaves on more mature growth. The leaves can be mistaken for those of the catalpa.

The seeds are winged and disperse by wind and water. Pollarded trees do not produce flowers, as these form only on mature wood.

Paulownia tomentosa requires full sun for proper growth.  It is tolerant of pollution and can tolerate many soil types. It can also grow from small cracks in pavements and walls. Paulownia can survive wildfires because the roots can regenerate new, very fast-growing stems.

Range

Native range

Asia

 Uzbekistan

India
 Bhimtal

China
 Anhui, Gansu, Hebei, Henan, Hubei, Hunan, Jiangsu, Jiangxi, Liaoning, Shaanxi, Shanxi, Sichuan

Korean peninsula
 Korean peninsula

Introduced range

Europe
In August 2021 the EPPO added P. tomentosa to its Alert List, not due to any particular known problem within Europe, but as a step to begin assessing whether it should be regarded as a problematic invader.
 Austria, Belgium, Czech Republic, France (including Corsica), Germany, Hungary, Italy (including Sardinia and Sicily), Slovenia, Switzerland, United Kingdom

Africa
 South Africa

North America

United States
 Alabama, Arkansas, Connecticut, Delaware, Florida, Georgia, Hawaii, Kentucky, Louisiana, Maryland, Mississippi, Missouri, New Jersey, New York, North Carolina, Ohio, Oklahoma, Oregon, Pennsylvania, South Carolina, Tennessee, Texas, Virginia, Washington, West Virginia

Oceania
 New Zealand

Asian introduced range
 Japan

Uses
Paulownia tomentosa is cultivated as an ornamental tree in parks and gardens. It has gained the Royal Horticultural Society's Award of Garden Merit.

Because of its tolerance and flexibility, Paulownia functions ecologically as a pioneer plant. Its nitrogen-rich leaves provide good fodder and its roots prevent soil erosion. Eventually, Paulownia is succeeded by taller trees that shade it and in whose shade it cannot thrive.

These are popular in the modern style of gardening which uses large-foliaged and "architectural" plants.

The soft, lightweight seeds were commonly used as a packing material by Chinese porcelain exporters in the 19th century, before the development of polystyrene packaging. Packing cases would often leak or burst open in transit and scatter the seeds along rail tracks. The magnitude of the numbers of seeds used for packaging, together with seeds deliberately planted for ornament, has allowed the species to be viewed as an invasive species in areas where the climate is suitable for its growth, notably Japan and the eastern United States.

In Japan, where the tree's name of Princess Tree originates, its name stems from the practice of planting seeds of the tree when a couple has a daughter; it is said that by the time the daughter is in her older teens or at the peak of adulthood when she is ready to marry, the tree by this time has also grown to maturity, which is then felled and made into a tansu dresser as a wedding gift.

P. tomentosa has been suggested as a plant to use in carbon capture projects, as it is capable of C4 carbon fixation. P. tomentosa displays markedly efficient photosynthesis, has large leaves that readily absorb pollutants, and also has value in timber and aesthetics, adding to interest surrounding its use in carbon capture.

Composition
Some geranyl flavonoids can be found in P. tomentosa.

Verbascoside can also be produced in hairy roots cultures of P. tomentosa.

Pictures

References

External links

 Species Profile - Princess Tree (Paulownia tomentosa), National Invasive Species Information Center, United States National Agricultural Library. Lists general information and resources for Princess Tree.

Paulowniaceae
Trees of China
Trees of Korea
Naturalized trees of Alabama